There were seven special elections to the United States House of Representatives in 1935, during the 74th United States Congress, sorted here by election date.

List of elections 

|-
| 
| colspan=3 | Vacant
|  | Representative-elect Frederick Landis died before the Congress began.New member elected January 29, 1935.Republican gain.
| nowrap | 

|-
| 
| John McDuffie
|  | Democratic
| 1918
|  | Incumbent resigned March 2, 1935, to become U.S. District Judge.New member elected July 30, 1935.Democratic hold.
| nowrap | 

|-
| 
| Francis Condon
|  |  Democratic
| 1930 
|  | Incumbent resigned January 10, 1935, to become Associate Justice of the Rhode Island Supreme Court.New member elected August 6, 1935.Republican gain.
| nowrap | 

|-
| 
| Cap R. Carden
|  | Democratic
| 1930
|  | Incumbent died June 13, 1935.New member elected November 5, 1935.Democratic hold.
| nowrap | 

|-
| 
| William F. Brunner
|  | Democratic
| 1928
|  | Incumbent resigned September 27, 1935, after being elected Sheriff of Queens County, New York.New member elected November 5, 1935.Democratic hold.
| nowrap | 

|-
| 
| Anthony J. Griffin
|  |  Democratic
| 1918 
|  | Incumbent died January 13, 1935.New member elected November 5, 1935.Democratic hold.
| nowrap | 

|-
| 
| Henry M. Kimball
|  | Republican
| 1934
|  | Incumbent died October 19, 1935.New member elected December 17, 1935.Republican hold.
| nowrap | 

|}

References

 
1935